All Things Are Possible may refer to:

Literature
 "All things are possible", a phrase from the New Testament of the Christian Bible, as told in the story of Jesus and the rich young man
 All Things Are Possible, a 1905 book by Russian existentialist philosopher Lev Shestov
 All Things Are Possible, a 1988 book by American author Sue Monk Kidd
 All Things Are Possible: My Story of Faith, Football, and the First Miracle Season, a 2000 book by Kurt Warner and Michael Silver
 All Things Are Possible: The Verlen Kruger Story: 100,000 Miles by Paddle, a 2006 book by Phil Peterson; see Verlen Kruger

Music

Albums
 All Things Are Possible (Dan Peek album), a 1979 album (including a title song) by Dan Peek
 All Things Are Possible, a 1995 album by Edwin Hawkins
 All Things Are Possible, a 1996 album by The Blind Boys of Alabama
 All Things Are Possible, a 1997 album by Hillsong Worship

Songs
 "All Things Are Possible", a 1957 song by Harmonizing Four
 "All Things Are Possible", a 1968 song by Johnny Greenwood
 "All Things Are Possible" (song), a 1979 song by Dan Peek
 "All Things Are Possible", a 1986 song by Mr. Lee "Scratch" Perry and the Upsetters on the album Battle of Armagideon (Millionaire Liquidator)
 "All Things Are Possible", a 2012 song by Blues Traveler on the album Suzie Cracks the Whip

Other
 All Things Are Possible (political party), a minor political party in South Africa

See also
 With God, all things are possible, the motto of the U.S. State of Ohio
 All Things Possible, a 2012 album by Contemporary Christian musician Mark Schultz
 All Things Possible: Setbacks and Success in Politics and Life, a 2014 book by Andrew M. Cuomo